Izvalta Parish is an administrative unit of Krāslava Municipality, Latvia.

Towns, villages and settlements of Izvalta parish 

Parishes of Latvia
Krāslava Municipality